Codonocarpus is a small genus of shrubs or small trees in the family Gyrostemonaceae.

The three species are all endemic to Australia:

Codonocarpus attenuatus (Hook.) H.Walter - Bell-fruit Tree (New South Wales)
Codonocarpus cotinifolius (Desf.) F.Muell. - Bell-fruit Tree (Victoria), Native Poplar (New South Wales, South Australia, Western Australia), Desert Poplar (South Australia)
Codonocarpus pyramidalis (F.Muell.) F.Muell. - Camel Poison (South Australia)

References

Brassicales genera
Gyrostemonaceae
Rosids of Australia